The Hill committees are the common name for the political party committees that work to elect members of their own party to United States Congress ("Hill" refers to Capitol Hill, where the seat of Congress, the Capitol, is located). The four major committees are part of the Democratic and  Republican parties and each work to help members of their party get elected to each chamber (the House of Representatives and the Senate).

The committees
The four major committees are the:
 Democratic Congressional Campaign Committee (DCCC; commonly pronounced "D-triple-C")
 National Republican Congressional Committee (NRCC)
 Democratic Senatorial Campaign Committee (DSCC)
 National Republican Senatorial Committee (NRSC)

Two third parties have Hill committees as well: The Libertarian Congressional Campaign Committee (LCCC) and Libertarian Senatorial Campaign Committee (LSCC) for the Libertarian Party and the Green Senatorial Campaign Committee (GSCC) for the Green Party of the United States.

Each committee works to recruit, assist, and support candidates of their own party, for their own chamber, in targeted races around the country. The committees contribute directly to candidates' campaigns, while also lending expertise, providing campaign-related services, and making independent expenditures. They raise funds at the national level from donors whose focus is on Congress as a whole, rather than individual campaigns.

Hill committee chairs of the major parties are incumbents of each body chosen each election cycle by the leadership of their caucus (the House Democratic Caucus, House Republican Conference, Senate Democratic Caucus, and Senate Republican Conference). Typically they are proven fundraisers with national political ambitions who are not facing competitive re-election campaigns. The committees are run on a day-to-day basis by a professional staff with campaign experience.

External links
 Democratic Congressional Campaign Committee official website
 Democratic Senatorial Campaign Committee official website
 Green Senatorial Campaign Committee official website
 Libertarian National Campaign Committee official website
 National Republican Congressional Committee official website
 National Republican Senatorial Committee official website

Legislative branch of the United States government